Se Nada Mais Der Certo is a 2009 Brazilian drama film directed by José Eduardo Belmonte.

Synopsis
Léo is a journalist covering events for newspapers outside of São Paulo. He is in serious financial trouble, made worse by delays in getting paid. Ângela shares an apartment with Léo and has a 6-year-old son, who is practically raised by his nanny. Depressed, Ângela stays in bed for most of the day and goes out looking for fun at night. One night, Léo decides to spend the little money he has at the nightclub where Ângela goes, and meets Marcin, a trans man. Soon, they become friends and decide to drink, together with Wilson, a taxi driver who believes he needs a psychiatrist. Gradually, a strong emotional bond grows between them, which increases when they decide to play a dangerous game.

Cast
 João Miguel as Wilson
 Carol Abras as Marcin
 Cauã Reymond as Léo
 Leandra Leal as Georgina
 Luiza Mariani as Ângela
 Roberta Rodrigues as Isabel
 Milhem Cortaz as Sybelle
 Adriana Lodi as Leda
 Henrique Rabelo as Lucas
 Murilo Grossi as Abílio
 Tainá Müller as Mile

References

External links
 

2009 films
Brazilian drama films
2000s Portuguese-language films
2009 drama films